is a neo-Nazi political party in Japan. It is headed by Kazunari Yamada, who maintains a website and blog which includes praise for Adolf Hitler and the September 11 attacks. Pictures of Yamada, a Holocaust-denier, posing with Cabinet minister Sanae Takaichi and LDP policy research chief Tomomi Inada were discovered on the website and became a source of controversy; both have denied support for the party.

Beliefs 
In the 1990s, the group campaigned for the expulsion of visa overstayers in Japan. The NSJWP campaigns against what it believes to be Jewish influence on both the world stage and in Japan's national affairs. The party advocates the abolishment of the monarchy and the restoration of the shōgunate, as it believes that the Imperial House of Japan became subservient to international Jewry following World War II, and believes that the shogunate is the Japanese equivalent of the Führer principle. The NSJWP also campaigns against economic refugees, race mixing, and Freemasonry. The party also campaigns for what it calls "corporatistic autarky".

The NSJWP is also Turanist, anti-capitalist, anti-communist, anti-Korean, anti-Chinese, anti-Russian, and anti-American.

See also

References

External links 
 
  – A Japanese Neo-Nazi, a short documentary about the party by VICE Japan

1982 establishments in Japan
Nationalist parties in Japan
Political parties established in 1982
Far-right politics in Japan
Fascism in Japan
Neo-Nazi political parties
Neo-Nazism in Asia
Antisemitism in Japan
Anti-Korean sentiment in Japan
Anti-communist organizations in Japan